Thomas Moore Philson (10 August 1817 – 22 November 1899) was a New Zealand doctor and hospital superintendent.

He was born in Derry, County Londonderry, Ireland in 1817. After a military career, he set up a private practice as a surgeon in Auckland. Despite his relative youth, within a decade, he held all important administrative medical positions in Auckland. He was superintendent of Auckland Hospital from 1859.

References

1817 births
1899 deaths
Military personnel from Derry (city)
New Zealand surgeons
Irish emigrants to New Zealand (before 1923)
New Zealand medical administrators